The 1969–70 QMJHL season was the first season in the history of the Quebec Major Junior Hockey League. Eleven teams formed the new league, ten from Quebec and one from Ontario. Eight teams came from the Quebec Junior Hockey League, the Drummondville Rangers, Quebec Remparts, Saint-Jérôme Alouettes, Shawinigan Bruins, Sherbrooke Castors, Sorel Éperviers, Trois-Rivières Ducs and Verdun Maple Leafs; two from the Metropolitan Montreal Junior Hockey League, the Rosemont National and Laval Saints; and the Cornwall Royals from the Central Junior A Hockey League. The teams played 56 games each in the schedule.

The Quebec Remparts finished first place in the regular season, and won the  President's Cup, defeating the Saint-Jérôme Alouettes in the finals. The Remparts then defeated the P.E.I. Islanders from the Maritimes, then competed for the George Richardson Memorial Trophy, losing to the Montreal Junior Canadiens 3 games to 0 for the Eastern Canada title.

Final standings
Note: GP = Games played; W = Wins; L = Losses; T = Ties; Pts = Points; GF = Goals for; GA = Goals against

complete list of standings.

Scoring leaders
Note: GP = Games played; G = Goals; A = Assists; Pts = Points; PIM = Penalties in Minutes

 complete scoring statistics

Playoffs
Guy Lafleur was the leading scorer of the playoffs with 43 points (25 goals, 18 assists).

All-star teams
First team
 Goaltender - Gilles Meloche, Verdun Maple Leafs
 Left defence - Larry O'Connor, Laval Saints
 Right defence - Jacques Lapierre, Shawinigan Bruins
 Left winger - Luc Simard, Trois-Rivières Ducs
 Centreman - Guy Lafleur, Quebec Remparts
 Right winger - Pierre Plante, Drummondville Rangers
 Coach - Maurice Filion, Quebec Remparts
Second team 
 Goaltender - Richard Coutu, Rosemont National and Billy Smith, Cornwall Royals 
 Left defence - Ronald Legault, Sorel Éperviers 
 Right defence - Richard Campeau, Sorel Éperviers and Michel Ruest, Cornwall Royals 
 Left winger - Michel Archambault, Drummondville Rangers 
 Centreman - Richard Leduc, Trois-Rivières Ducs
 Right winger - Mike Morton, Shawinigan Bruins 
 Coach - Claude Dolbec, Shawinigan Bruins
Source:

Trophies and awards
Team
President's Cup - Playoff Champions, Quebec Remparts
Jean Rougeau Trophy - Regular Season Champions, Quebec Remparts
Frank J. Selke Memorial Trophy - West Division Champions, Saint-Jérôme Alouettes

Player
Jean Béliveau Trophy - Top Scorer, Luc Simard, Trois-Rivières Ducs
Jacques Plante Memorial Trophy - Best GAA, Michel Deguise, Sorel Éperviers
Michel Bergeron Trophy - Rookie of the Year, Serge Martel, Verdun Maple Leafs

See also
1970 Memorial Cup
1970 NHL Entry Draft
1969–70 OHA season
1969–70 WCHL season
George Richardson Memorial Trophy

References

External links
 Official QMJHL Website
 www.hockeydb.com/

Quebec Major Junior Hockey League seasons
QMJHL